Heath Charles Farwell (born December 31, 1981) is an American football coach and former linebacker who is the special teams coordinator for the Jacksonville Jaguars of the National Football League (NFL). He previously served as an assistant coach for the Buffalo Bills, Carolina Panthers and Seattle Seahawks.

Farwell played college football at San Diego State University and was signed by the Minnesota Vikings as an undrafted free agent in 2005. He played for 10 seasons in the NFL with the Vikings and Seattle Seahawks and was the special teams captain during his tenure with the Seahawks.

Early years
Farwell attended Corona High School in Corona, California, and was a letterman in football, baseball, and track&field. As a junior, he had 96 tackles and 12 sacks en route to all-league honors. He recorded 129 tackles and 10 sacks as a senior, earning first-team all-Mountain View League as well as all-Riverside Press-Enterprise county all-star. In 2014, his football number was retired by Corona High School.

Playing career

College
Farwell played at San Jose State in 2000 before transferring to San Diego State University. After sitting out the 2001 season due to NCAA transfer rules, Farwell debuted with the San Diego State Aztecs in 2002 as a sophomore. He was ranked 5th on the team with 59 tackles, and his three quarterback sacks were 4th in the Mountain West Conference among linebackers. During the season, he also recorded 10 tackles for loss, while having a season best eight tackles versus UCLA. His four forced fumbles were tops in Mountain West. The following year, he started six games at outside linebacker and finished the season with 52 tackles and 3.5 quarterback sacks. He also recovered two fumbles on the season versus Air Force and UCLA, and had a season high eight tackles versus Utah. As a senior, he started all 11 games for the Aztecs and was third on the team with 69 total tackles. He also added a team best seven sacks, two interceptions and forced four fumbles. Farwell finished his career with 180 tackles, 13.5 sacks and nine forced fumbles in three seasons at San Diego State.

National Football League

Minnesota Vikings
Farwell was signed as an undrafted free agent in 2005 out of San Diego State. He was named the special teams MVP for the Vikings at the end of the 2006 NFL season. In the team's preseason opener in 2008, Farwell suffered a torn ACL in his knee and was placed on season-ending injured reserve.

Farwell received a $7.5 million contract over three years from the Vikings. He was voted as a NFC 2010 Pro Bowl special teams starter.

On September 3, 2011, Farwell was waived by the Vikings. His release cleared $1.75 million in salary cap space for the Vikings.

Seattle Seahawks
Farwell signed with the Seattle Seahawks on October 19, 2011. On March 13, 2012, he was re-signed by the Seattle Seahawks. He served as a special teams captain for the Seahawks from 2012 onward. Farwell and the Seahawks won Super Bowl XLVIII after they defeated the Denver Broncos by a score of 43–8. The Seahawks placed Farwell on injured reserve on August 26, 2014.

Coaching career

Seattle Seahawks
On August 16, 2016, Farwell returned to the Seahawks, where he served as a two-time special teams captain in his four years in Seattle (2011–14), as a coaching assistant.

Carolina Panthers
In 2018, Farwell was hired by the Carolina Panthers as their assistant special teams coordinator.

Buffalo Bills
In 2019, Farwell was hired by the Buffalo Bills as their special teams coordinator under head coach Sean McDermott.

Jacksonville Jaguars
On February 17, 2022, Farwell was hired by the Jacksonville Jaguars as their special teams coordinator under head coach Doug Pederson.

References

External links
 Jacksonville Jaguars profile
Minnesota Vikings profile
Seattle Seahawks profile
San Diego State Aztecs profile 

1981 births
Living people
American football linebackers
Buffalo Bills coaches
Carolina Panthers coaches
Jacksonville Jaguars coaches
Minnesota Vikings players
National Conference Pro Bowl players
Players of American football from California
San Diego State Aztecs football players
San Jose State Spartans football players
Seattle Seahawks coaches
Seattle Seahawks players